The 2020 Malaysian International Classic Race was a road cycling one-day race that took place on 15 February 2020 in Malaysia, starting and finishing in Kuah, the capital of the Langkawi district in the state of Kedah. It was the inaugural edition of the Malaysian International Classic Race and was rated as a 1.1 event as a part of the 2020 UCI Asia Tour. This race was created initially as a one-off race to be a part of the festivities for the 25th anniversary of the Tour de Langkawi; however, organizers have expressed desires to make this race an annual event in the future.

French rider Lucas De Rossi of  placed third after winning the reduced bunch sprint behind.

Teams
Twenty-one teams, which consisted of one UCI WorldTeam, five UCI Professional Continental teams, fourteen UCI Continental teams, and one national team, were invited to the race. These teams were the same teams that had just competed in the 2020 Tour de Langkawi, which finished the previous day. Of the 120 riders who started the race, only 28 finished.

UCI WorldTeams

 

UCI Professional Continental Teams

 
 
 
 
 

UCI Continental Teams

 
 
 
 
 
 
 
 
 
 
 
 
 
 

National Teams

 Malaysia

Result

References

External links
 

2020 UCI Asia Tour
2020 in Malaysian sport
February 2020 sports events in Malaysia